The Banu Ka'b are a nomadic Arab tribe which originated in the Najd region of the Arabian Peninsula, and inhabit Saudi Arabia, Iraq, Kuwait, and Iran (Khuzestan). They often raided, then settled various areas of southern and central Ottoman Iraq, in cities such as Basra and Nasiriyah, and also across the border in modern-day Khuzestan province in Iran, particularly near the city of Al-Muhammarah. From the early 18th century onwards, the Banu Ka'b began converting from Sunni to Shia Islam. Other branches of Bani Ka'b settled in Oman, the United Arab Emirates, and Morocco.

In the mid-eighteenth century, Banu Ka'b had a strong navy, and sometimes attacked British ships, and fought either for or against the Ottomans and Persians. In 1812, the Emirate of Muhammara emerged as an autonomous emirate under Banu Ka'b. Banu Ka'b had their tribe flag as a sometimes yellow or red flag with tribe and branch sayings.

They also had a skirmish with the naval force of Kuwait called Al Riqqa. Sheikh Barakat of Banu Ka'b asked for the hand of Kuwait sheikh's daughter in marriage and the sheikh refused, that infuriated Sheikh Barakat and caused him to attack Kuwait however his ships got stuck in the sand because of the shallow water. In this skirmish no one died however the Kuwaitis technically won because they salvaged what they could from Banu Ka'bs stuck ships. Sheikh Barakat tried to muster more men to attack Kuwait but the people killed him for his incompetence and for his willingness to risk the lives of his tribesmen for something trivial.

Notable people
Among the tribe's members are: 
 Al-Nābigha al-Jaʽdī, early Islamic poet and Companion of Muhammad
 Khazʽal Ibn Jabir, last rulers of the Emirate of Muhammara

See also
Sheikh Jabir al-Ka'bi
Emirate of Muhammara
Uqaylid dynasty
Usfurids

References

Further reading
 
 

Tribes of Arabia
Tribes of Saudi Arabia
Tribes of Iraq
Tribes of the United Arab Emirates
Bedouin groups
Society of Iraq
Kaab, Bani
Society of the United Arab Emirates
History of Khuzestan Province
Banu 'Amir